Henri Ribaut (1872 – 14 February 1967, in Toulouse) was a French naturalist and entomologist. He was a specialist in  Hemiptera notably  Auchenorrhyncha Sternorrhyncha, Heteroptera, and Coleorrhyncha.
His collection which includes Hymenoptera is held by the University of Toulouse, Laboratoire d'Entomologie.

Works
partial list 
Faune de France Volume n° 31 - Henri Ribaut (1872-1967) - Homoptères Auchénorhynques. I. Typhlocybidae. 1936, 231 p. (réimpression 1986)
Faune de France Volume n° 57 - Henri Ribaut (1872-1967) - Homoptères Auchénorhynque II. Jassidae. 1952, 474 p. (réimpression 2000)

References
Emmrich, R. 2003  History of Auchenorrhyncha research in central Europe.
Wagner, W. 1968: [Ribaut, H.] Entomologische Zeitschrift, Frankfurt a. M 78 (21), pp. 245-246.
Groll, E. K. (2017). Biographies of the Entomologists of the World. Online database, version 8. Senckenberg Deutsches Entomologisches Institut, Müncheberg

French entomologists
1967 deaths
1872 births